SS Scharnhorst may refer to one of the following passenger steamers for North German Lloyd:

 , in service from 1904–1919; given to France as war reparations in 1919

Ship names